The Richmond Symphony Youth Orchestra Program (YOP) is a program for students that introduces them into the world of the symphony. YOP is sponsored by the Richmond Symphony.

History
The Richmond Symphony Youth Orchestra was founded in the spring of 1962 by Edgar Schenkman and is the oldest youth orchestra in the state of Virginia. It was a partnership between the Richmond Symphony Orchestra and Richmond Public Schools. The schools provided the venues, students, and music stands, and the Richmond Symphony provided Edgar Schenkman and the rest of the artistic leadership. While originally only one orchestra, by 1981 had expanded to three orchestras, the original Richmond Symphony Youth Orchestra, the Richmond Symphony Youth Concert Orchestra, and the Richmond Symphony String Sinfonietta. In 2004, a fourth ensemble was added, the Richmond Symphony Camerata Strings. In 2008, the Richmond Symphony Youth Orchestra played at the Kennedy Center with the Richmond Symphony Orchestra to celebrate the 50th anniversary of the Richmond Symphony. YOP created a fifth ensemble, the Wind Ensemble, in 2018 for young wind players looking to explore orchestra literature.

Orchestras
The orchestras accept students up through 12th grade.
All five ensembles meet weekly and participate in coaching and masterclasses by Richmond Symphony musicians, mentoring, and other activities. The orchestras are the top orchestral training ensembles of central Virginia.

String Sinfonietta: Conducted by Christie-Jo Adams. The String Sinfonietta is an all-string ensemble for young musicians, originally conducted by Joseph Wargo from 1983 to 2004.

Camerata Strings: Conducted by Rebecca Jilcott. Camerata Strings is an all-string ensemble.

Wind Ensemble: Conducted by Christopher Moseley. Wind Ensemble our newest ensemble in the Youth Orchestra Program and helps to bridge the gap for beginning wind players who are looking to join our youth orchestras.

Youth Concert Orchestra (YCO): Conducted by Sandy Goldie. YOP's lower-level full orchestra.

Richmond Symphony Youth Orchestra (RSYO): Conducted by Richmond Symphony Orchestra Assistant Conductor, Daniel Myssyk. RSYO is YOP's top level full orchestra.

Audition Requirements
All students must participate in their school band or orchestra program.

String Sinfonietta:  No formal audition, but required to know:

C, D, and G major scales, 2 octave preferred (1 octave for bass).

All Strings: 1st position notes on all strings

Violins: basic 3rd position on the E string

Cellos: basic 2 ½  and 3rd position on the A string

Basses: basic 2 ½ and 3rd position on the G string (high C/D area)

Camerata Strings: Entry by audition.

 Scales: all major scales up to 3 sharps and 3 flats, 2 octaves (Bass 1 octave)

Violin: G major, 3 octaves

Viola: C major, 3 octaves

Cello: C major 3 octaves

Bass: F major 2 octaves

Sightreading
Solo Piece

Must be about 3 minutes and best demonstrate the abilities of the student. Equivalent to VBODA or ASTA level 3-4                

Wind Ensemble: No formal audition.  Students are expected to be familiar with the following:

 Scale Requirements - All Instruments: Major Scales up to 3 Sharps and Flats: C, F, B-flat, E-flat, G, D, A, and Chromatic Scale, minimum 1 octave, tempo: quarter note = 96
 Notation knowledge - Sixteenth, eighth, quarter, half & whole notes, dotted rhythms
 Time signatures - 2/4, 3/4, 4/4 & 6/8 time

Youth Concert Orchestra (YCO): Audition Requirements:

Scale Requirements - (Quarter = 120)

Strings Scales of your choice,

Violin: G, A, B-flat, B & C major scales, 3 octaves
g, a, b, & c melodic minor scales, 3 octaves

Viola: C, D, E-flat, E & F major scales, 3 octaves
c, d, e, & f melodic minor scales, 3 octaves

Cello: C, D, E-flat, E & F major scales, 3 octaves
c, d, e, & f melodic minor scales, 3 octaves

Bass: E, F, G & A major scales, 2 octaves
e, f, g, & a melodic minor scales, 2 octaves

Winds: All major/melodic minor scales up to 4 sharps/flats, 2 octaves Chromatic scale, 2 octaves preferred

Percussion: Scales on a mallet instrument. Ability to play a roll (pp-ff) on snare drum

 Sight Reading (required for all instrumentalists) -

Viola players should be prepared to read in treble clef. Cello, bassoon, and trombone players should be prepared to read in tenor clef

Solo Requirements - Applicants must prepare a 3-minute piece that best demonstrates their playing ability Must be equivalent to VBODA or ASTA's level of 4-5. Percussionists must be prepared to play a solo on snare or a mallet instrument

Richmond Symphony Youth Orchestra (RSYO): Audition Requirements:

 Scales

Harp - Scales of your choice, 4 octaves hands together

Strings - All major scales – 3 octaves (Bass: 2 octaves)
Melodic minor scales up to 4 sharps/flats, 3 octaves (Bass: 2 octaves)

Winds - All major/melodic minor scales up to 4 sharps/flats, 2 octaves
Chromatic scale, 2 octaves preferred

Percussion - Scales on a mallet instrument
Ability to play a roll (pp-ff) on snare drum
•

 Sight Reading (required for all instrumentalists)
  
Viola players should be prepared to read in TREBLE clef

Cello, bassoon, and trombone players should be prepared to read in TENOR clef
•

 Orchestral Excerpt

Applicants will prepare an orchestral excerpt relevant to his/her instrument (downloaded from website). Trumpets and horns must be prepared to transpose.

When to audition?

Auditions for new students trying to enter the program and current YOP students looking to audition up into a new ensemble are held yearly in late May and early June.

Audition dates for the 20-21 YOP season are scheduled for:

 May 19, 2020
 May 26, 2020
 June 2, 2020

See also
 Richmond Symphony Orchestra

External links
 http://www.richmondsymphony.com/

Sources
Halbruner, Aimee. "Slideshow of RSYO at the Kennedy Center." E-mail to Kristin Grasberger.3 June 2008.

"Richmond Symphony Youth Orchestras." Richmond Symphony. 2008. Richmond Symphony Orchestra. 8 Jun 2008 <http://www.richmondsymphony.com/youth_orch.asp>.

List of youth orchestras in the United States

American youth orchestras
1962 establishments in Virginia
Musical groups established in 1962
Youth organizations based in Virginia
Musical groups from Virginia
Organizations based in Richmond, Virginia
Performing arts in Virginia